Waldorf Astoria Berlin is a hotel in Berlin, Germany. It is located in the City West area of Berlin , next to the upscale retail area Kurfürstendamm. It opened on January 3, 2013, and is the first Waldorf Astoria branded hotel in Germany. Guerlain Spa, the only one in Germany, is located at the hotel.

Building

The Waldorf Astoria Berlin is situated in the Berlin building Zoofenster. It is a skyscraper in the district of Charlottenburg in Berlin. It has 32 floors and a height of 118 m and was constructed from July 2008 to March 2012.

Awards
The hotel won World Luxury Spa Awards for 2014, and a Europe's Leading New Hotel of World Travel Awards.

See also
List of tallest buildings in Berlin

References

External links
 * Waldorf Astoria Berlin official website

Berlin
Hotels in Berlin
Skyscrapers in Berlin
Buildings and structures in Charlottenburg-Wilmersdorf
Skyscraper hotels in Germany
Hotel buildings completed in 2012
Hotels established in 2013

de:Zoofenster